The Fast Set is a 1924 American silent comedy-drama film directed by William C. deMille and starring Betty Compson. The film is based on the 1923 Broadway play, Spring Cleaning, by Frederick Lonsdale.

Plot
As described in a review in a film magazine, Richard Sones (Dexter), novelist, prefers the company of intellectuals, while his wife Margaret (Compson) prefers a fast set. Differences in tastes and a lack of understanding of each begin to alienate them, and Ernest Steele (Menjou), leader of the fast set, hastens the crisis by making love to Margaret. As an object lesson to his wife, Richard brings Mona (Pitts), a woman of the streets, to his wife's dinner party and tells the guests that her presence should not be resented as she is a professional in the same game they play as amateurs. Margaret decides upon a divorce until she learns that Steele is not eager to marry her. Steele then takes a hand, convincing Richard that he has been too inattentive and showing him how to win back his wife, who really loves him.

Cast

Preservation
With no copies of The Fast Set located in any film archives, it is a lost film.

See also
 Women Who Play (1932)

References

External links

Lobby or window card (Wayback Machine)
Zasu Pitts in the film (archived)
Anne Shirley, Zasu Pitts (archived)
Anne Shirley, Zasu Pitts (archived)
Movie herald The Fast Set (archived)

1924 films
American silent feature films
Lost American films
Films directed by William C. deMille
American films based on plays
Paramount Pictures films
1924 comedy-drama films
1920s English-language films
American black-and-white films
1924 lost films
Lost comedy-drama films
1920s American films
Silent American comedy-drama films